Knyazhe is a rural locality (a village) in Sizemskoye Rural Settlement, Sheksninsky District, Vologda Oblast, Russia. The population was 219 as of 2002. There are 3 streets.

Geography 
Knyazhe is located 26 km north of Sheksna (the district's administrative centre) by road. Yeremeyevo is the nearest rural locality.

References 

Rural localities in Sheksninsky District